In quantum mechanics, Bargmann's limit, named for Valentine Bargmann, provides an upper bound on the number  of bound states with azimuthal quantum number  in a system with central potential . It takes the form

Note that the Dirac delta function potential attains this limit. After the first proof of this inequality by Valentine Bargmann in 1953, Julian Schwinger presented an alternative way of deriving it in 1961.

Rigorous formulation and proof 
Stated in a formal mathematical way, Bargmann's limit goes as follows. If

then the number of bound states  with azimuthal quantum number  for a particle of mass  obeying the corresponding Schrödinger equation, is bounded from above by

Although the original proof by Valentine Bargmann is quite technical, the main idea follows from two general theorems on ordinary differential equations, the Sturm Oscillation Theorem and the Sturm-Picone Comparison Theorem. From the Sturm-Picone Comparison Theorem, it follows that when subject to a stronger potential  (i.e.  for all ), the number of nodes either grows or remains the same.

By applying variation of parameters, one can obtain the following implicit solution

where  is given by

From this, we can conclude that

proving Bargmann's limit. The idea to obtain such a potential, is to approximate Dirac delta function potentials, as these attain the limit exactly. An example of such a construction can be found in Bargmann's original paper.

References

Quantum mechanics